Metzneria albiramosella is a moth of the family Gelechiidae. It was described by Hugo Theodor Christoph in 1885. It is found in Turkmenistan.

References

Moths described in 1885
Metzneria